Royal police may refer to:

 Royal Air Force Police (RAFP)
 Royal Australian Corps of Military Police (RACMP)
 Royal Bhutan Police (RBP)
 Royal Brunei Police Force (RBPF)
 Royal Canadian Mounted Police (RCMP)
 Royal Cayman Islands Police Service (RCIPS)
 Royal Falkland Islands Police (RFIP)
 Royal Gibraltar Police (RGP)
 Royal Grenada Police Force (RGPF)
 Royal Hong Kong Police (RHKP) (1969-1997)
 Royal Lao Police (RLP)
 Royal Malaysia Police (RMP)
 Royal Marines Police (RMP)
 Royal Military Police (RMP)
 Royal Montserrat Police Service (RMPS)
 Royal Navy Police (RNP)
 Royal Oman Police (ROP)
 Royal Saint Lucia Police (RSLP)
 Royal Thai Police (RTP)
 Royal Virgin Islands Police Force (RVIPF)
 Royal Police College (disambiguation)
 Royal Police Escort, Norway
 Royal Parks Police London, UK